St Ives Priory was a priory in Cambridgeshire, England. It was established in 1017 by monks from Ramsey Abbey.

References

Monasteries in Cambridgeshire
Anglo-Saxon monastic houses
1017 establishments in England
Christian monasteries established in the 11th century
Benedictine monasteries in England
1539 disestablishments in England